Höpen Airfield is a glider airfield near the town of Schneverdingen in Lower Saxony, Germany. It supports glider flying with no commercial aviation at the field.

History

Towards the end of World War II, the landing field was used by the British Royal Air Force as Advanced Landing Ground B-154 Reinsehlen.

References

 World Airport Codes Flugplatz Hoepen
 Johnson, David C. (1988), U.S. Army Air Forces Continental Airfields (ETO), D-Day to V-E Day; Research Division, USAF Historical Research Center, Maxwell AFB, Alabama.

Heidekreis
Airports in Lower Saxony
Gliding in Germany